In terms of geomorphological division, the Czech Republic is a very diverse territory, located in the territory of four geomorphological provinces within four geomorphological subsystems. The Bohemian Massif within the sub-system of Hercynian Forest forms three quarters of the country. The southeastern and eastern part of the Czech territory belongs to the Western Carpathians within the Carpathian Mountains. The remaining two provinces, Western Pannonian Basin within the Pannonian Basin and North European Plain within the European Plain, cover only a small part of the Czech territory in the southeast and the northeast.

The provinces are further subdivided into subprovinces, macroregions, mesoregions, microregions and areas. The generally accepted division of the relief of the Czech Republic into subprovinces, macroregions and mesoregions is given below.

Basic geomorphological division

Bohemian Massif
 Bohemian Forest Subprovince
 Upper Palatine Forest Macroregion
 Upper Palatine Forest
 Upper Palatine Forest Foothills
 Cham-Furth Depression
 Bohemian Forest Highlands
 Bohemian Forest
 Bohemian Forest Foothills
 Gratzen Mountains
 Gratzen Foothills
 Bohemian-Moravian Subprovince
 Central Bohemian Hills
 Benešov Uplands
 Vlašim Uplands
 Tábor Uplands
 Blatná Uplands
 South Bohemian Basins
 České Budějovice Basin
 Třeboň Basin
 Bohemian-Moravian Highlands
 Křemešník Highlands
 Upper Sázava Hills
 Iron Mountains
 Upper Svratka Highlands
 Křižanov Highlands
 Javořice Highlands
 Jevišovice Uplands
 Brno Highlands
 Boskovice Furrow
 Bobrava Highlands
 Drahany Highlands
 Ore Mountains Subprovince
 Ore Mountains Highlands
 Fichtel Mountains
 Ore Mountains
 Elbe Sandstone Mountains
 Podkrušnohorská Macroregion
 Cheb Basin
 Sokolov Basin
 Most Basin
 Doupov Mountains
 Central Bohemian Uplands
 Karlovy Vary Highlands
 Slavkov Forest
 Teplá Highlands
 Sudetes
 Western Sudetes
 Lusatian Highlands
 Lusatian Mountains
 Ještěd–Kozákov Ridge
 Zittau Basin
 Frýdlant Hills
 Jizera Mountains
 Giant Mountains
 Giant Mountains Foothills
 Central Sudetes
 Broumov Highlands
 Orlické Mountains
 Podorlická Uplands
 Kłodzko Valley
 Eastern Sudetes
 Zábřeh Highlands
 Mohelnice Depression
 Hanušovice Highlands
 Snieznik Mountains
 Golden Mountains
 Zlatohorská Highlands
 Hrubý Jeseník
 Nízký Jeseník
 Sudeten Foreland
 Vidnava Lowland
 Žulová Hilly Land
 Poberoun Subprovince
 Brdy Macroregion
 Džbán
 Prague Plateau
 Křivoklát Highlands
 Hořovice Uplands
 Brdy Highlands
 Plzeň Uplands
 Rakovník Uplands
 Plasy Uplands
 Švihov Highlands
 Bohemian Table
 North Bohemian Table
 Ralsko Uplands
 Jičín Uplands
 Central Bohemian Table
 Lower Eger Table
 Jizera Table
 Central Elbe Table
 East Bohemian Table
 East Elbe Table
 Orlice Table
 Svitavy Uplands

Western Carpathians
 Outer Subcarpathia
 Western Outer Subcarpathia
 Weinviertel Foothills
 Dyje–Svratka Valley
 Upper Morava Valley
 Vyškov Gate
 Moravian Gate
 Northern Outer Subcarpathia
 Ostrava Basin
 Outer Western Carpathians
 South-Moravian Carpathians
 Mikulov Highlands
 Central Moravian Carpathians
 Ždánice Forest
 Litenčice Hills
 Chřiby
 Kyjov Hills
 Slovak-Moravian Carpathians
 Vizovice Highlands
 White Carpathians
 Maple Mountains
 Western Beskidian Foothills
 Moravian-Silesian Foothills
 Western Beskids
 Hostýn-Vsetín Mountains
 Rožnov Furrow
 Moravian-Silesian Beskids
 Jablunkov Furrow
 Silesian Beskids
 Jablunkov Intermontane

North European Plain
 Polish Plain
 Silesian Lowlands
 Opava Hilly Land

Western Pannonian Basin
 Vienna Basin
 South Moravian Basin
 Lower Morava Valley
 Záhorie Lowland
 Chvojnice Hills

Notes

References

Literature

Lists of landforms of the Czech Republic
Physiographic divisions